Strouss was a department store serving the U.S. states of Ohio and Pennsylvania.

History
The company was founded as Strouss-Hirshberg Co. by Isaac Strouss and Bernard Hirshberg, two young Americans of Jewish descent. It was long the leading department store in the Mahoning and Shenango Valleys.   Under the ownership of May Department Stores, which purchased Strouss in 1947, its name was shortened to Strouss and was expanded throughout northern Ohio and western Pennsylvania under the leadership of C.J. Strouss, then president of Strouss.  In 1986, May Company made a corporate decision to consolidate the Strouss division into Kaufmann's.  May promptly shut down many of its former locations in 1987 in part due to the depressed economy of the Youngstown metropolitan area and a strategic decision by May Company to focus on mall-only retail locations within the Kaufmann's division.

References

 EXECUTIVE CHANGES.  (29 April 1982).  The New York Times.
 THE MAY DEPARTMENT STORES CO. ANNOUNCES ELECTIONS.  (15 July 1985).  PR Newswire. 
 MAY STORES COMBINES TWO RETAIL DIVISIONS.  (3 January 1986).  Wall Street Journal.
 MAY DEPT STORES COMBINES STROUSS, KAUFMANN'S DIVISIONS.  (2 January 1986).  Dow Jones News Service.
 Store Consolidation Seen at Federated.  (18 January 1986).  The New York Times.
 MAY DEPARTMENT STORES REPORTS RECORD FIRST QUARTER NET EARNINGS AND SALES.  (20 May 1986).  PR Newswire.
 MAY DEPARTMENT STORES CO reports earnings for Qtr to May 3.  (21 May 1986).  The New York Times.
 THE MAY DEPARTMENT STORES CO. REPORTS THIRD QUARTER AND FIRST NINE MONTHS SALES AND EARNINGS.  (18 November 1986).   PR Newswire. 
 Old department stores see new development.  (11 August 1990).  The Plain Dealer.
 Old stores get new look.   (11 August 1990).  The Plain Dealer.
 May Department Stores Co.  (26 September 1990).  Advertising Age.
 Fred L. Gronvall Sr.  (11 October 1997).  The Patriot Ledger.
 Dillard's edit on database.  (16 November 2001).  The Youngstown Vindicator.
 Youngstown, Ohio, Department Store Keeps Kaufmann's Name despite Consolidation.  (10 August 2002).  The Youngstown Vindicator.
 Kaufmann's to keep name despite consolidation.  (10 August 2002).  The Youngstown Vindicator.
 City awards contract for razing of parking deck.  (21 April 2000).  The Youngstown Vindicator.

Defunct department stores based in Ohio
Companies based in Youngstown, Ohio
Defunct companies based in Ohio
Retail companies disestablished in 1986